Extravaganza is an annual campus music festival held at the University of California, Santa Barbara that began in 1979 and has been held every year since 1989. Named as the #1 event on the "Top 10 University Festivals to Crash" by College Magazine in 2013, it takes place towards the end of spring quarter and is funded by a student lock-in fee. The event is planned, promoted, and run by the Associated Students Program Board, part of the Associated Students of the University of California, Santa Barbara.

Extravaganza is held in Harder Stadium and draws thousands of students and out of town visitors every year. As of 2011, the festival is only open to UCSB students, staff, and faculty. The stage occupies the north end of the field while booths for student groups, sponsors, and activities line the sides. Attendees must comply with a mandatory pat down and bag search (carried out by Community Service Organization officers) before entering the stadium.

History 
In its early years, Extravaganza began as a showcase for local bands.  It had originally been open to UCSB students as well as the surrounding community.  Due to rising costs and increasing crowds, as of the 2011 edition only those with a UCSB-affiliation are allowed entry.

Extravaganza expanded to feature two stages, but this practice was ended in 2005 due to a decision to downsize the number of bands in favor of bigger-name acts. However, the first performer remains a local act, usually chosen through a Battle of the Bands.  The acts have also transitioned into more well known, mainstream performers than those of earlier versions of Extravaganza.

May 16, 2009 was Extravaganza's 30th anniversary. The format of the festival was altered in order to mark this special occasion. Instead of being the usual day show (11 AM to dusk), X '09 transitioned from day to night, with gates opening at 3 PM and the headliner (Ludacris) concluding his set at approximately midnight. A large high definition screen was placed next to the stage in order to give the back of the crowd a better view of the acts. ASPB requested student-made short film submissions to be played between sets.

Talent

1980s 
 June 1, 1980
Jailbait, Reverie, Tom Ball & Kenny Sultan, Oasis, Steve Wood & Beth Fichet Band, John Kay & Steppenwolf, Cecilio & Kapono, Kaikea Roe, Kapono Lizama,

 May 31, 1981
100%, Missing Persons, Pelin, Wild Blue Yonder, Eric Burdon, Paul Rodriguez, Contingency

 May 16, 1982
The Beat, D-Day, Al Vizzutti, Skanksters, Pura Vida

 May 21, 1983
Mojo, Transport, One Heart, 20/20, Tommy Tutone

 May 20, 1984
Jack Mack and the Heart Attack, The Ventures, Mr. Mister, The Rastafarians, The Michael Jackson Band

 May 17, 1986
Lone Justice, The Busboys, Babylon Warriors, Fishbone, IV All Stars

 May 17, 1987
Common Sense, Confusion, Burning Couches, Crucial DBC

*.  May 1988

Stevie Nicks

 May 6, 1989
Jane's Addiction, Mary's Danish, Toad The Wet Sprocket, Common Sense, Burning Couches

1990s 
 May 19, 1990
Agent Orange, Havalina, Timmy Gatling, Everlast, The Groov, The Itch, Milestone Easy, The Mudheads

 May 11, 1991
Mary's Danish, Trulio Disgresias, No Doubt, Lula and Afro Brasil, Dread Flimstone, Ugly Kid Joe, Montage W/ Soul

 May 16, 1992
Eleven, Fungo Mungo, Skankin' Pickle, Indica, Los Guys, Evil Farmer

 May 22, 1993
Fishbone, The Pharcyde, Taumbu, Half Way Home, Sun 60, Mother Tongue, The Graceful Punks

 May 21, 1994
They Might Be Giants, Del tha Funkee Homosapien, Frente!, Casual, The Muffs, The Grays, Ben Harper

 May 13, 1995
Sublime, Coolio, The Untouchables, Mojo Nixon, The Fuzz, The Nonce, Jimmy 2 Times

 May 18, 1996
NOFX, Aceyalone, Skankin' Pickle, Tha Alkaholiks, Big Bad Voodoo Daddy, Jimmy 2 Times

 May 17, 1997
Ben Harper, Five For Fighting, Kurtis Blow, Down By Law, The Upbeat, Cool Water Canyon, The Leftovers, Fidget

 May 16, 1998
Social Distortion, The Roots, Royal Crown Revue, Ozomatli, Animal Liberation Orchestra

 May 22, 1999
Main Stage - Run-DMC, The Vandals, Hepcat, Del the Funky Homosapien

Second Stage - Blazing Haley, Dial 7, The Cannons, 4DK, D.J. Pat

2000s 
 May 20, 2000
Main Stage - Spearhead, Ozomatli, The Black Eyed Peas, The Aquabats, Vivendo de Paò

Second Stage - Neosoreskin, Government Grown, Vinyl, Sick Shift, Pressure 4-5

 June 2, 2001
Main Stage - The Pharcyde, Save Ferris, Tha Liks, Jack Johnson, Ozma

Second Stage - Gravity Willing, Titsofrenix, Warsaw, Ambionic, Pressure 4-5

 May 18, 2002
De La Soul, The Breeders, Zebrahead, Aceyalone

 May 17, 2003
Main Stage - Dilated Peoples, Slightly Stoopid, Eve 6, Nerf Herder, Dredg

Second Stage - Ankore, Kissing Tigers, the History Of, Blue Room, Falsehood

 May 22, 2004
Main Stage - MxPx, Talib Kweli, Donavon Frankenreiter, The Bronx, MF Doom

Second Stage - Code 415, The Colour, The Penfifteen Club, Satin, The Return

 May 15, 2005
Busta Rhymes, Damian Marley, RJD2, The Walkmen, The Hairbrain Scheme

 May 21, 2006
E-40, Pepper, The Pharcyde, Animal Liberation Orchestra, Rebelution

 May 20, 2007
T.I., Ben Kweller, Mickey Avalon, Suburban Legends, Boombox Orchestra

 May 18, 2008
Nas, Saosin, Hellogoodbye, Blue Scholars, Out of State

 May 16, 2009
Ludacris, Asher Roth (surprise guest), Girl Talk, Cold War Kids, The Cool Kids, Rebelution, Willy Northpole, Boombox Orchestra

2010s 
 May 15, 2010
Drake, Birdman (surprise guest), Chromeo, Edward Sharpe and the Magnetic Zeros, Super Mash Bros, Soul Minded

 May 15, 2011
Cee Lo Green, Rusko, Talib Kweli, The Expendables, Sprout

 May 20, 2012
Snoop Dogg, Wolfgang Gartner, Iration, Surfer Blood, The Fire Department

May 19, 2013
Kendrick Lamar, Dada Life, J-Boog, The Growlers, Alpha Phunk

May 18, 2014
Diplo, Local Natives, Chance the Rapper, Jhené Aiko, Yancellor Chang, T-Fresh

May 17, 2015
Miguel, Madeon, AlunaGeorge, Joey Bada$$, Bad Rabbits

May 15, 2016
ODESZA, Rae Sremmurd, Anderson .Paak & the Free Nationals, Zella Day, Emancipator

May 21, 2017
Schoolboy Q, GRiZ, Tinashe, Thundercat, Twin Peaks

May 20, 2018
Dillon Francis, Charli XCX, DRAM, Coast Modern
May 19, 2019
Playboi Carti, Aminé, Deorro, Empress Of, Peach Pit

Attendance 
 May 22, 2004 : 7,000+
 May 15, 2005 : 9,000+
 May 21, 2006 : 7,000+
 May 20, 2007 : 6,000+
 May 18, 2008 : 8,000+
 May 16, 2009 : 12,000+ overall, with 4,000+ in and out.
 May 15, 2010 : 12,000+ at peak, with 1,500 circulating.

Line up release 
Each year ASPB strives to announce the Extravaganza line up in a creative manner that engages student body participation.

 May 18, 2008 : A flash mob of students acting like dinosaurs was organized as a banner bearing the line up was dropped in Storke Plaza.
 May 16, 2009 : Fortune cookies holding the name of an act were distributed throughout campus to encourage students to share and discuss the line up.
 April 29, 2010 : A viral marketing campaign was launched on Facebook, Twitter, and the official AS Program Board website. At peak, the website received 1,600 requests per second.
 May 8, 2012 : -
 May 9, 2013 : - 
 May 5, 2015 : AS Program Board hid bottles around campus with names of artist inside
 May 10, 2016 : AS Program Board had a live graffiti artist paint the names of the artist to reveal the lineup
 May XX, 2017: AS Program Board unveiled banners with the various acts in Storke Plaza
 May 14, 2018: AS Program Board had a student hide along the coast in a dragon outfit carrying an egg with the headliner

Promotional material

Notes

References

External links 
 UCSB Associated Students Program Board website - http://aspb.as.ucsb.edu/
 Extravaganza 2005 Photo Album - http://photo.as.ucsb.edu/main.php/v/aspb/x05
 Extravaganza 2006 Photo Album - http://photo.as.ucsb.edu/main.php/v/aspb/x06
 Extravaganza 2007 Photo Album - http://photo.as.ucsb.edu/main.php/v/aspb/x07

University of California, Santa Barbara
1979 establishments in California
Music festivals in California
Rock festivals in the United States
Music festivals established in 1979
Reggae festivals in the United States
Hip hop music festivals in the United States